Matsumyia trifasciata is a species of hoverfly in the family Syrphidae.

It can be found in Taiwan. They are also diurnal.

References

Eristalinae
Diptera of Asia
Insects described in 1930